Colon is a genus of round fungus beetles in the family Leiodidae. There are at least 80 described species in Colon.

Species
These 84 species belong to the genus Colon:

 Colon aedeagosum Hatch, 1957 i g
 Colon affine Sturm, 1839 g
 Colon angulare Erichson, 1837 g
 Colon appendiculatum (Sahlberg, 1822) g
 Colon arcticum Munster, 1911 g
 Colon arcum Peck and Stephan, 1996 i g
 Colon armipes Kraatz, 1854 g
 Colon asperatum Horn, 1880 i g b
 Colon barcelonicum Pic, 1908 g
 Colon barnevillei Kraatz, 1858 g
 Colon basale Hatch, 1957 i g
 Colon beszedesi Depoli, 1915 g
 Colon bidentatum (Sahlberg, 1834) i g
 Colon blatchleyi Peck and Stephan, 1996 i g
 Colon boreale Peck and Stephan, 1996 i g
 Colon brundini Palm, 1941 g
 Colon brunneum (Latreille, 1807) g
 Colon calcaratum Erichson, 1837 g
 Colon californicum Peck and Stephan, 1996 i g
 Colon celatum Horn, 1880 i g
 Colon chenggongi Hoshina, 2009 g
 Colon chihuahua Peck and Stephan, 1996 i g
 Colon chiricahua Peck and Stephan, 1996 i g
 Colon claviger Herbst, 1797 g
 Colon clavigerum (Herbst, 1797) g
 Colon cloueti Guillebeau, 1896 g
 Colon curvipes Mäklin, 1880 g
 Colon delarouzei Tournier, 1863 g
 Colon dentatum LeConte, 1853 i g b
 Colon dentipes (Sahlberg, 1822) g
 Colon discretum Hatch, 1933 i g
 Colon distinctipes Pic, 1901 g
 Colon elongatum Notman, 1919 i g
 Colon emarginatum Rosenhauer, 1856 g
 Colon forceps Hatch, 1957 i g b
 Colon fuscicorne Kraatz, 1852 g
 Colon grossum Peck and Stephan, 1996 i g
 Colon hatchi Peck and Stephan, 1996 i g
 Colon hesperium Peck and Stephan, 1996 i g
 Colon horni Szymczakowski, 1981 i g
 Colon hubbardi Horn, 1880 i g b
 Colon incisum Peck and Stephan, 1996 i g
 Colon inerme Mannerheim, 1852 i g
 Colon lableri Roubal, 1934 g
 Colon lanceolatum Hatch, 1957 i g
 Colon latum Kraatz, 1850 g
 Colon liebecki Wickham, 1902 i g
 Colon longitarse Reitter, 1884 g
 Colon longitorsum Peck & Stephan, 1996 i g b
 Colon magnicolle Mannerheim, 1853 i g b
 Colon megasetosum Peck & Stephan, 1996 i g b
 Colon mesum Peck and Stephan, 1996 i g
 Colon monstrosum Peck and Stephan, 1996 i g
 Colon moreanum Pic, 1910 g
 Colon murinum Kraatz, 1850 g
 Colon nitidum Peck and Stephan, 1996 i g
 Colon oblongum Blatchley, 1910 i g b
 Colon pacificum Peck and Stephan, 1996 i g
 Colon pararectum Peck and Stephan, 1996 i g
 Colon politum Peck and Stephan, 1996 i g
 Colon potosi Peck and Stephan, 1996 i g
 Colon pseudolatum Palm, 1941 g
 Colon pubescens Lucas, 1846 g
 Colon puncticeps Czwalina, 1884 g
 Colon puncticolle Kraatz, 1850 g
 Colon purkynei Fleischer, 1909 g
 Colon rectum Hatch, 1933 i g
 Colon robustum Obenberger, 1917 g
 Colon rufescens Kraatz, 1850 g
 Colon schwarzi Hatch, 1933 i g b
 Colon sekerae Reitter, 1909 g
 Colon serratum Hatch, 1957 i g
 Colon serripes (Sahlberg, 1822) g
 Colon similare Peck and Stephan, 1996 i g
 Colon sinuatipes Reitter, 1911 g
 Colon stolzi Roubal, 1917 g
 Colon subcurvipes Reitter, 1885 g
 Colon thoracicum Horn, 1880 i g b
 Colon tibiale Hatch, 1957 i g
 Colon troglocerum Reitter, 1884 g
 Colon vancouverense Peck and Stephan, 1996 i g
 Colon viennense Herbst, 1797 g
 Colon xilitla Peck and Stephan, 1996 i g
 Colon zebei Kraatz, 1854 g

Data sources: i = ITIS, c = Catalogue of Life, g = GBIF, b = Bugguide.net

References

Further reading

External links

 

Leiodidae
Articles created by Qbugbot